Seaca may refer to several places in Romania:

 Seaca, Olt, a commune in Olt County
 Seaca, Teleorman, a commune in Teleorman County
 Seaca, a village in Dofteana Commune, Bacău County
 Seaca, a village in Logrești Commune, Gorj County
 Seaca, a village in Poboru Commune, Olt County
 Seaca, a village in Sălătrucel Commune, Vâlcea County
 Seaca, a district in the town of Călimănești, Vâlcea County
 Seaca (Moldova), a tributary of the Moldova in Suceava County
 Seaca, a tributary of the Tărlung in Brașov County